The Don Roman Santos Building is a neoclassical building located along the historic Escolta Street in Santa Cruz, Manila, Philippines. It fronts Plaza Lacson (formerly Plaza Goiti) which leads to directly to Carriedo Street or to Rizal Avenue. It was built in 1894 and expanded in 1957.

The site has been the original offices for Monte de Piedad Savings Bank from 1894 to 1937. It then became an American Red Cross-operated hospital from 1945 to 1947 after which housed Prudential Bank and South Supermart. Currently, the ground floor serves a branch for the Bank of the Philippine Islands after it acquired Prudential Bank in 2005.

Details

References

External links

Buildings and structures in Santa Cruz, Manila
Office buildings in Metro Manila
Cultural Properties of the Philippines in Metro Manila
Tourist attractions in Manila
Buildings and structures completed in 1894
19th-century architecture in the Philippines